Sebastian Schmidt (born 1 February 1978) is a German luger who competed from 1998 to 2007. He won the silver medal in the men's doubles event at the 2006 FIL European Luge Championships in Winterberg, Germany.

References
Associated Press profile
FIL-Luge profile
List of European luge champions

External links
 

1978 births
Living people
German male lugers
21st-century German people